Verishen is a village in the Goris Municipality of the Syunik Province in Armenia.

Demographics

Population 
The Statistical Committee of Armenia reported its population was 2,532 in 2010, up from 2,314 at the 2001 census.

Gallery

References 

Populated places in Syunik Province